Stefan Posch (born 14 May 1997) is an Austrian footballer who plays as a defender for  club Bologna, on loan from 1899 Hoffenheim. He also represents the Austria national team.

Club career
On 1 September 2022, Posch joined Serie A club Bologna on loan with an option to buy and a conditional obligation to buy.

International career
Posch made his Austria national football team debut on 10 June 2019 in a Euro 2020 qualifier against North Macedonia, as a half-time substitute for Aleksandar Dragović.

Career statistics

Club

International

International goals

Scores and results list Austria's goal tally first, score column indicates score after each Posch goal.

Notes

References

External links
 
 

1997 births
Footballers from Styria
People from Judenburg
Living people
Austrian footballers
Austria youth international footballers
Austria under-21 international footballers
Austria international footballers
Association football defenders
TSG 1899 Hoffenheim II players
TSG 1899 Hoffenheim players
Bologna F.C. 1909 players
Regionalliga players
Bundesliga players
UEFA Euro 2020 players
Austrian expatriate footballers
Austrian expatriate sportspeople in Germany
Expatriate footballers in Germany
Austrian expatriate sportspeople in Italy
Expatriate footballers in Italy